This is a list of members of the South Australian Legislative Council between 1985 and 1989. As half of the Legislative Council's terms expired at each state election, half of these members were elected at the 1982 state election with terms expiring in 1989, while the other half were elected at the 1985 state election with terms expiring in 1993.

 Labor MLC Frank Blevins had resigned late in the previous term in order to contest the Legislative Assembly seat of Giles at the 1985 state election. Blevins was not due to face re-election that year, so the new parliament needed to fill a casual vacancy to cover the remaining four years of his term. George Weatherill was appointed on 11 February 1986.
 Labor MLC Brian Chatterton resigned on 2 February 1987. Trevor Crothers was appointed to the resulting casual vacancy on 24 February 1987.
 Liberal MLC Murray Hill resigned on 4 July 1988. Julian Stefani was appointed to the resulting casual vacancy on 4 August 1988.
 Labor MLC Dr John Cornwall resigned on 31 January 1989. Ron Roberts was appointed to the resulting casual vacancy on 14 February 1989.

References

 "Statistical Record of the Legislature, 1837–2007", Parliament of South Australia, 2007.
 "History of South Australian Elections, 1857–2006", Dean Jaensch, 2006.

Members of South Australian parliaments by term
20th-century Australian politicians